The Division of Cowper is an Australian electoral division in the state of New South Wales.

Geography
Since 1984, federal electoral division boundaries in Australia have been determined at redistributions by a redistribution committee appointed by the Australian Electoral Commission. Redistributions occur for the boundaries of divisions in a particular state, and they occur every seven years, or sooner if a state's representation entitlement changes or when divisions of a state are malapportioned.

History

The division was created in 1900 and was one of the original 65 divisions contested at the first federal election. It is named after Sir Charles Cowper, an early Premier of New South Wales.

Except for one brief break, the seat has been held by the National Party (previously known as the Country Party) and its predecessors since 1919. Its most prominent member has been Sir Earle Page, former leader of the Country Party and interim Prime Minister of Australia in 1939.  He represented Cowper from 1919 to 1961, longer than any other MP who represented one seat for his entire career. It has usually been a fairly safe National Party seat, and became more so when its more urbanised area (including Page's hometown of Grafton) was shifted to the newly created Division of Page in 1984.

The division is located on the north coast of New South Wales, and on its current boundaries takes in the towns of Coffs Harbour, Port Macquarie, Kempsey,  Macksville and Nambucca Heads.

In February 2016, New South Wales federal electoral districts were redistributed. The northern parts of Cowper, from Sapphire Beach to Red Rock were shifted to the division of Page. Since the 2019 election, the member for Cowper has been Pat Conaghan, representing the National Party of Australia.

Members

Election results

References

Notes

Electoral divisions of Australia
Constituencies established in 1901
1901 establishments in Australia